Ross Cheever (born April 12, 1964 in Rome, Italy) is a retired American race car driver and is the younger brother of former Formula One driver and Indianapolis 500 champion Eddie Cheever. Born in Rome, Ross never completed a full season in elite level motorsport, however, he did make four CART starts for A. J. Foyt Enterprises in 1992 and drove for Dome in Formula 3000 and Japanese Formula Three in the early 1990s. He also raced in the Japanese Formula 3000 Championship, winning 10 races and finishing second in 1989 and 1991, and third in 1992, 1993 and 1994. During the winter of 1985 and 1986 Cheever competed in Formula Atlantic in New Zealand driving a Ralt RT4 and won the New Zealand Grand Prix both years.

He retired in 1994 but returned to become a test driver for Eddie's Cheever Racing in 2000 as the team transitioned to Infiniti engines. He was entered in a second Cheever Racing car for the Indianapolis 500 and completed rookie orientation but did not make a qualifying attempt.

Racing record

Complete International Formula 3000 results
(key)

Complete Japanese Formula 3 results
(key)

Complete Japanese Formula 3000 results
(key)

Complete 24 Hours of Le Mans results

American open–wheel racing results
(key)

Indy Lights

CART

Indy Racing League

References
 Ross Cheever can't shake racing bug, aiming for Indy spot by Terry Callahan, The Auto Channel
 Driver Database stats
 Racing Reference - US stats

1964 births
American racing drivers
Champ Car drivers
Indy Lights drivers
Japanese Formula 3000 Championship drivers
Japanese Formula 3 Championship drivers
Living people
International Formula 3000 drivers
24 Hours of Le Mans drivers
American expatriate sportspeople in Italy
American expatriate sportspeople in Japan
Racing drivers from Rome
World Sportscar Championship drivers

Cheever Racing drivers
Team LeMans drivers
A. J. Foyt Enterprises drivers
TOM'S drivers